Men's 50 metre rifle three positions (then known as small-bore free rifle) was one of the thirteen shooting events at the 1992 Summer Olympics. It was the first Olympic competition after the introduction of the new target in 1989, and thus two Olympic records were set, by Juha Hirvi (qualification round) and Hrachya Petikyan (final). Petikian won ahead of Robert Foth and Ryohei Koba, after a poor final demoted Hirvi to fourth place.

Qualification round

OR Olympic record – Q Qualified for final

Final

OR Olympic record

References

Sources

Shooting at the 1992 Summer Olympics
Men's 050m 3 positions 1992
Men's events at the 1992 Summer Olympics